Burca may refer to :

 Burca, a 5th century episcopal see in Numidia (Roman province), North Africa
 Burca (butterfly)
 Burca, a village in the commune Vidra, Vrancea, Romania

See also 
 Burqa, article of clothing fully covering the female body.